Symphylans, also known as garden centipedes or pseudocentipedes, are soil-dwelling arthropods of the class Symphyla in the subphylum Myriapoda. Symphylans resemble centipedes, but are very small, non-venomous, and only distantly related to both centipedes and millipedes. They consume decaying vegetation, but can do considerable harm in an agricultural setting by consuming seeds, roots, and root hairs in cultivated soil.

Juveniles have six pairs of legs, but over a lifetime of several years, they add an additional pair at each moult so an adult instar usually has twelve pairs of legs. Most adult symphylans have twelve leg pairs, but the first pair is absent or vestigial in some species (e.g., those in the genus Symphylella), so adults in some species have only eleven leg pairs. Symphylans lack eyes. Their long antennae serve as sense organs. They have several features linking them to early insects, such as a labium (fused second maxillae), an identical number of head segments and certain features of their legs.

About 200 species are known worldwide.

Description 
Symphyla are small, cryptic myriapods without eyes and without pigment.

The head has long, segmented antennae, a postantennal organ, three pairs of mouthparts: mandibles, the long first maxillae, and the second pair of maxillae which are fused to form the lower lip or labium of the mouth. Disc-like organs of Tömösváry, which probably sense vibrations, are attached to the base of the antennae, as they are in centipedes.

The trunk comprises 15–24 segments, which are protected by overlapping dorsal plates. Ten or twelve segments bear legs. The first segment is large and usually provided with a pair of legs, the last segment is slender, lacks legs, and possesses a pair of cerci. Immature individuals have six pairs of legs on hatching. Each pair of legs is associated with an eversible structure, called a "coxal sac", that helps the animal absorb moisture, and a small stylus that may be sensory in function. Similar structures are found in the most primitive insects.

Symphyla are rapid runners. They are primarily herbivores and detritus feeders living deep in the soil, under stones, in decaying wood, and in other moist places. The garden symphylan, Scutigerella immaculata can be a pest of crops. A species of Hanseniella has been recorded as a pest of sugar cane and pineapples in Queensland. A few species are found in trees and in caves. A species of Symphylella has been shown to be predominantly predatory, and some species are saprophagous.

Symphylans breathe through a pair of spiracles on the sides of their head, and are the only arthropods with spiracle openings on the head. These are connected to a system of tracheae that branch through the head and the first three segments of the body only.

The genital openings are located on the fourth body segment, but the animals do not copulate. Instead, the male deposits 150 to 450 packages of sperm, or spermatophores, on small stalks. The female then picks these up in her mouth, which contains special pouches for storing the sperm. She then lays her eggs, and attaches them to the sides of crevices or to moss or lichen with her mouth, smearing the sperm over them as she does so. The eggs are laid in groups of eight to twelve.

Symphylans have been reported as living up to four years, and moult throughout their life.

Fossil record and evolution
The symphylan fossil record is poorly known, with only five species recorded, all placed in living genera. The oldest records of both families are found in Burmese amber from the middle Cretaceous, approximately 99 million years ago. As a result, both families are thought to have diverged before the end of the Mesozoic Era.

Despite their common name, morphological studies commonly place symphylans as more closely related to millipedes and pauropods than the centipedes, in the clade Progoneata.  Molecular studies have shown conflicting results, with some supporting the Progoneata clade, others aligning symphylans with centipedes or other arthropods, although some are weakly supported.

References

Further reading

External links

 

Myriapods
Arthropod classes
Taxa named by John A. Ryder